Camilo Ramírez Puente (born 17 July 1959) is a Mexican politician from the From 2009 to 2012 he served as Deputy of the LXI Legislature of the Mexican Congress representing Nuevo León.

References

1959 births
Living people
People from San Luis Potosí
Members of the Chamber of Deputies (Mexico)
National Action Party (Mexico) politicians
21st-century Mexican politicians